(alternatively written しらぬい まい) is a fictional character in the Fatal Fury and The King of Fighters series of fighting games by SNK. She has also appeared in other media of these franchises and in a number of other games since her debut in 1992's Fatal Fury 2 as the first female character in an SNK fighting game. She also appears in the games' various manga and anime adaptations and plays a leading role in the live-action film.

In the series' canon lore, Mai is a modern-world young female ninja and the granddaughter of the ninjutsu master Hanzo Shiranui, with the ability to create and control fire. She is a founding member of the King of Fighters Tournament's Women Fighters Team and is madly in love with the American fighter Andy Bogard, who she self-proclaimed her fiancé, though he is not interested in a romantic relationship. Yet, she still pursues him endlessly.

Largely due to her sex appeal, Mai has become one of the most popular, recognizable and celebrated female characters of the fighting game genre, especially in Japan, China, and some other East Asian countries, often being compared to Capcom's Chun-Li. She has also become SNK's primary sex symbol and mascot character featured in many merchandise products and representing the company in many crossover and spin-off titles, in addition to licensed appearances in numerous games by other companies, as well as becoming a trendy subject of cosplay and modeling.

Character

Characteristics and portrayal 
According to the SNK universe's early canon, Mai Shiranui was born on January 1, 1974, though the year was later omitted due to the sliding timescale of the games. She is a practitioner of her family's ancient Shiranui-ryū ninjutsu, the empty-handed art of koppo-ken and has also been taught additional close-combat techniques by her grandfather's friend judo master Jubei Yamada. Having been strictly disciplined by her grandfather from an early age, she has become a proud fighter who hates to lose.

Usually relaxed, enthusiastic, uninhibited and cheerful, Mai has a charismatic, flamboyant and flirtatious personality, as well as exhibitionistic tendencies. She has been madly in love with Andy Bogard, an American who studied the arts Shiranui ninjutsu with her grandfather Hanzo, since her and Andy's early teens. She is a friend of Joe Higashi and Andy's older brother, Terry Bogard. Regarding her standard education, Mai is a bookkeeper and secretary by profession. She deeply cares for her nation's and family's traditions, including battle outfits and ceremonial clothing, as well as having learned archery, calligraphy, koto playing, and performing the tea ceremony and the flower arrangement art. However, she is also fond of modern foreign things, such as American style casual fashion and heavy metal music (her favourite band being Pantera). As a girlfriend, she is gentle, kind and enjoying cooking (especially osechi dishes) and only occasionally losing her temper.

Her first name, "Mai", is the Japanese word for "dance" and her surname is the title of a Japanese optical phenomenon similar to will-o'-the-wisp, in reference to the character's pyrokinetic abilities. These powers enable her to cloak herself in fire; channel it through her clothes, weapons and anything she touches and cause explosions. She can change her clothes in an instant, as well as to temporarily stay airborne, float, glide and control her movements and change directions in mid-air, and is also a master of climbing and stealth. Her fighting style is to "float like a butterfly, sting like a bee". Mai's weapons are her "Fire Butterfly Fans" that can be used in close quarters and as projectiles. She furthermore has a variety of hand-to-hand combat maneuvers, such as a diving attack ("Flying Squirrel Dance") and a rushing cartwheel kick followed by an elbow strike ("Deadly Ninja Bees").

In most of the games, Mai's Japanese voice actress has been Akoya Sogi (dubbed by Sheryl Stanley in the English versions of The King of Fighters: Maximum Impact series), until she was gradually replaced by Ami Koshimizu since the 2010s. Kotono Mitsuishi voiced Mai in the Fatal Fury anime films, with English dubbings provided by Sarah Sawatsky and Lisa Ann Beley, and Japanese voice actress and singer Megumi Hayashibara portrayed Mai in a series of drama CDs during the 1990s.

Conception and overall design

Mai Shiranui became SNK's first female playable fighting game character upon her Fatal Fury series debut in 1992. SNK had originally conceived two different characters—a male ninja and a Japanese idol—for Fatal Fury 2 prior to her creation. The ninja character's working name was just Ninja Master and he had been around 60% completed before being scrapped; his long scarf was turned into her "tails" and the female character's original name was already Mai. Further inspiration for Mai's appearance and attributes came from a number of sources. According to the Neo Geo publication Neo Geo Freak, Mai's bust was modeled on Fumie Hosokawa and her buttocks on Ai Iijima, while her breast "jiggle" was inspired by the tales of kunoichi using their bodies for seduction and distraction. Designer of the fighting game Battle Master: Kyuukyoku no Senshitachi claims Mai's overall looks and costume might have been modeled after his game's character Ranmaru, as he had unsuccessfully pitched it for SNK to have it published for the Neo-Geo before Toshiba-EMI eventually released it for the SNES.

In SNK games, Mai represents a traditional ideal of a Japanese woman. Her official character description in the games is listed as "The Gorgeous Ninja" or "Knock-out Ninja", and sometimes as "Red Ninja". The King of Fighters: Maximum Impact character Lien Neville conceptually began as a contrast to Mai Shiranui: while Mai represents a "sexy and beautiful kunoichi", Lien represents the "sexy Western femme fatale" and her outfits were purposely designed to be "tight and constricting" to contrast Mai's clothing, which is made to allow for easy and quick movements. Shinkiro, an illustrator who worked on The King of Fighters, considered the character Leona Heidern with her "ice queen" persona as a complete opposite of Mai.

Animation and costumes

As described by the Entertainment Software Rating Board, "the character wears a revealing outfit that accentuates her buttocks and displays large amounts of cleavage". Mai has been subjected to regional censorship in some games' export versions. In particular, her famed and influential breast-bounce animation was partially (idle pose) or entirely removed in several releases, including the international home version of The King of Fighters '94, in the European version of The King of Fighters '95 for the Sega Saturn, and in the U.S. versions of Fatal Fury 2, Fatal Fury Special, The King of Fighters 2000, and The King of Fighters 2002 and KOF '95 can be restored through the use of special cheat codes. Her usually very large breasts are smaller in some games, such as SNK vs. Capcom: SVC Chaos, and in some other media, especially in the live-action film.

Mai's appearance changes only slightly through most of the Fatal Fury and King of Fighters games. She has long hair (usually brown or red, but sometimes black) tied in a ponytail, with long bangs framing her face, and normally wears a sleeveless red uwagi with a decorative waistbandsometimes with long, decorative tails, and a loincloth with a red thong (replaced by shorts in some U.S. versions and more covering underwear in some European versions) around her crotch and rear. In Fatal Fury 2, Fatal Fury Special (1993) and The King of Fighters, Mai Shiranui wears a pair of soft-soled tabi. From Fatal Fury 3: Road to the Final Victory to Real Bout Fatal Fury (both in 1995) she wears instep guards, exposing her heels and toes. In the former, she also wears a red vest and eye shadow. Mai's hairpin is her beloved grandmother's keepsake.

In KOF: Maximum Impact (2004), Mai has much shorter and darker hair, and ninja clothing resembling that of Kasumi in the Dead or Alive series. Shinkiro said that Mai was the most difficult character to draw as he "thought she was going to burst out of her costume". In KOF: Maximum Impact 2 (2006), one of Mai's color schemes matches Andy Bogard's and she has blonde hair. Another outfit of Mai's with long green hair, tiger-print clothing and a hairpin with horns resembles that of Lum from the manga and anime series Urusei Yatsura and is based on Cham Cham from SNK's Samurai Shodown series. The Maximum Impact series' producer, Falcoon, said that designing Mai's alternate look was "unforgivable" as he was uncertain of fan reaction to the changes. SNK Heroines: Tag Team Frenzy introduced an advanced character customization for Mai as well as the others in the game.

Gameplay 
Gameplay-wise, Mai is known as a very quick and mobile fighter, however the tradeoff is she is dealing only limited damage with her attacks. She has been noted as the fastest yet physically weakest fighter in her first game, Fatal Fury 2. In opinion of Super Juegos, "despite her fragile appearance", Mai is one of the more effective contenders in Fatal Fury Special. According to a GamePro guide to Fatal Fury 3, "Mai's excellent speed and air superiority give her an advantage over some fighters, but her moves inflict little damage" and thus Mai players need to constantly keep on attacking their opponents in order to prevail. Furthermore, she might be easy to pick up play for new players, for example having been described as one of the easiest characters to master in Real Bout Fatal Fury by Sega Saturn Magazine. In Dead or Alive, Mai remains a speed type of character who is relatively easy to handle, and as such Famitsu recommended her as a good character for DOA beginners.

Appearances

Fighting games 
Mai Shiranui has first starred in Fatal Fury 2 where she goes to help Andy face the new host of The King of Fighters tournament, Wolfgang Krauser. She loses to Laurence Blood, who takes her captive to lure Andy. She also plays a supporting role in Fatal Fury 3: Road to the Final Victory and Real Bout Fatal Fury, gathering information to help in the fight against Geese Howardthe criminal who killed Andy and Terry's father, Jeff Bogard. The following games in the series, Real Bout Fatal Fury Special (1997) and Real Bout Fatal Fury 2: The Newcomers (1998), do not contain a storyline. Mai was added to the roster of Fatal Fury: Wild Ambition (1999), a 3D remake of Fatal Fury: King of Fighters which originally did not feature Mai.

The King of Fighters series tournament features Mai as a regular character participating in the annual tournaments in the Women Fighters Team (also known as the Woman Fighters Team, the Fighting Gals Team, and the Gorgeous Team), which she founds in The King of Fighters '94 after Andy refuses to let her enter and form a team with her. Initially, the team is composed of Mai, King and Yuri Sakazaki from the Art of Fighting series, with Mai aiming to help encourage King and her fellow team members and to prove to Andy the error of his ways. In The King of Fighters '99, the teams were expanded to four members, and so Mai goes to the Fatal Fury Team composed of Terry, Andy and Joe, being finally able to join the tournament in the same team as Andy. In the following tournament in The King of Fighters 2000, however, Mai is asked to step out to allow Blue Mary investigate a case. Denied again, she is angered by the request and joins the Women Fighters Team again and has remained a reoccurring member ever since. In the various team endings, she is often celebrating the team's victory at King's bar or fantasizing about Andy.

Mai eventually leaves the KOF tournament competitions in The King of Fighters XI (2005) to search for Andy who was absent in The King of Fighters 2003 (she appears in KOF XI only as an unlockable character in the PS2 version). In The King of Fighters XII, Mai is completely absent from the game itself (except a mention in Andy's profile) and appears only in the tie-in manga series, even as she has been was "teased" in a trailer and official website, and has been rumored to be added through DLC for the home version. In The King of Fighters XIII, Mai returns to the series when she feels that the KOF tournament is not complete without her and so decides to enter it along with the other two original members of KOF '94s Women's Team. She is not upset at Andy while making her choice, content to enter a tournament with both her and him in it once more. Mai returns in The King of Fighters XIV, in which the new character Banderas Hattori is obsessed with her but she is not interested. She is set to return in The King of Fighters XV.

Outside the main Fatal Fury / KOF titles, Mai has appeared playable in every game in the SNK vs. Capcom series of crossover fighting games since 1999. She is also playable character in the portable console fighting games SNK Gals' Fighters (2000) and NeoGeo Battle Coliseum (2005), and in a number of SNK mobile fighting games such as The King of Fighters (2003), Fatal Fury Mobile and Garou Densetsu vs Fighter's History Dynamite (2007), The King of Fighters-i (2011), and The King of Fighters D: DyDO Smile STAND (2017). In I.O. Entertainment's free-to-play Lost Saga, Mai is a premium character that was added in both female and male variations, originally in the Japanese version in 2012 and for the Chinese and Spanish-language versions in 2015. In 2016, Mai joined the cast of Koei Tecmo's fighting series Dead or Alive via DLC in Dead or Alive 5 Last Round, but this DLC is no longer available as of September 11, 2019. In the fan service fighting game SNK Heroines: Tag Team Frenzy, where she is dressed up as a cow in her default costume, Mai is fighting to be granted a wish to finally marry Andy. She returned to the DOA series as a DLC once more in Dead or Alive 6.

Other video games
Mai is featured as a playable character in the console shooter games KOF Sky Stage (2010) and Neo Geo Heroes: Ultimate Shooting, and the quiz game Quiz King of Fighters (1995), also appearing in the 1999-2006 SNK vs. Capcom spin-off crossover card battle series SNK vs. Capcom: Card Fighters Clash. In Bandai Namco's crossover tactical RPG Queen's Gate: Spiral Chaos (2011), Mai is a rival to Street Fighter character and fellow in-game playable Chun-Li.

She is also one of the heroes in the Thailand-exclusive MOBA game The King of Fighters Online. In a 2017 MMORPG The King of Fighters: World by Ledo Interactive, Mai is featured in person as a non-player and tutorial character, but the players will be able to use her Shiranui style for their own characters. She was to appear in never released and similarly titled MMO The King of Fighters' World from Shanda Interactive to lead the Ninja Team made of her, Andy, and Eiji Kisaragi.

She features, usually as a playable character, in various non-fighting KOF mobile games either developed or licensed by SNK, including KOF Gals Mahjong, KOF: Battle de Paradise, KOFM for Kakao, Mini King of Fighters, The Rhythm of Fighters, and The King of Fighters M, among many others. Some of them are beat 'em up games, such as The King of Fighters '97 OL (2015) and The King of Fighters: Destiny, or role-playing games, such as The King of Fighters '98: Ultimate Match Online (a tactical RPG) and The King of Fighters All Star (an action RPG in which up to three various versions of Mai from different other games may appear at once.) She is also featured in augmented reality game The King of Fighters Orochi Go.

Not-strictly Fatal Fury/KOF mobile games that have Mai among characters include SNK Dream Battle, SNK Beach Volley Gal's Attack, SNK Gal's Open: Cutey Shot, SNK Gals Island Dokidoki Puzzle Shock! and its sequel, Neo Geo Tennis Coliseum, You Are the Hero!, and Dai Shingeki RPG! Sister Quest. She is also featured in Samurai Shodown Slash (a beat 'em up crossover of Samurai Shodown and The King of Fighters) and in Metal Slug Defense (a tower defense crossover of KOF and Metal Slug), as well as in Beast Busters featuring KOF (a mobile remake of SNK's rail shooter Beast Busters, in a nurse outfit).

Guest and cameo appearances 
In the 1998 visual novel game The King of Fighters: Kyo, set in the KOF timeline between The King of Fighters '96 and The King of Fighters '97, Mai is a non-player character who provides the protagonist Kyo Kusanagi with information and help during his trials. Mai also makes cameo appearances on her "younger brother" and Andy's disciple Hokutomaru's stage in SNK fighting game Garou: Mark of the Wolves (with Andy), as well as in character endings in fighting games Samurai Shodown and Art of Fighting 2, and in the Neo Geo CD version of the Samurai Shodown series' role-playing video game Shinsetsu Samurai Spirits Bushidō Retsuden. In the North American release of the original Art of Fighting it is implied that Eiji Kisaragi has feelings for her, but this does not occur in the original Japanese version. In the 2000s dating sim series Days of Memories, Mai Shiranui retains her name and general design but is an otherwise unrelated character with a different role in each game (a rich maiden and protagonist's neighbor in Boku to Kanojo no Atsui Natsu, an office lady by day and a masked ninja vigilante by night in Koi wa Good Job!, a popular school beauty and the protagonist's classmate in Kaze Maou Miyako de Tsukamaete!, and a school beauty with strange motives in Sekai de Ichiban Atsui Fuyu.

Mai Shiranui has been furthermore featured as a usually playable guest character in many various games in mostly Asian markets, such as China-only dance game Dazzle Dance. To celebrate the 15th anniversary of The King of Fighter in 2009, Mai joined a Chinese MMORPG Yuyan Online. She was added as a player character to a Korean multiplayer beat 'em up Dungeon Fighter Online in 2010, and also joined the character rosters of two more Korean video games: an action game Mad Blade (formerly Bladecraft) and an endless runner Kal Kal Kal All Together in 2013. Mai was featured as an avatar replacement model to promote the Japanese MMORPG Wizardry Online in 2014.

Mai has been appearing making guest character appearances in especially many Asian games since 2014, when she was added to several Chinese games, including MOBAs 300 Heroes and The King of Soldier II, an action RPG Ultimate Heroes, beat 'em ups Fantasy Fighter and King of Fate, and an RTS Dragon Throne: Battle of Red Cliffs. She was also featured as a variant of character class Kunoichi in Korean MMORPG Black Desert Online to promote it in Japan. In 2016, Mai was licensed as a bonus character to the highest-grossing video game in the world: Wangzhe Rongyao, roughly translated to English as Honor of Kings, a mobile MOBA developed by TiMi Studio and Tencent, where she is a Mage class character, additionally starring in its official tie-in webcomic. She was further included in collaboration events in Brave Frontier, Game of Dice, and Samurai Kingdom.

In 2017, other collaboration events included a Mai avatar in an MMORPG Mabinogi Heroes, as well as her various guest appearances in many mobile games, including Boku to Dragon, Clash of Kings, Crash Fever, Crusaders Quest, GangRoad JOKER, Grand Summoners, Everybody's Marble, If World, Last Senkan, Rival Arena VS, Saishu Senkan: With Lovely Girls, Tower of Saviors, Valkyrie Connect, Venus Eleven Vivid!, World Cross Saga, and Yamato Chronicle. By mid-2018, she has further appeared in more games such as HIT and The Fellowship of The Dragon, also joining Puzzle & Dragons in celebration of the game's fifth anniversary, followed by Dungeon Hunter Champions, Knives Out-Tokyo Royale, Phantasy Star Online 2, Tokyo Prison, and more.

Film and animation

Mai Shiranui is a protagonist in the 2009 American live-action film The King of Fighters, which is loosely based on the games. She was played by Maggie Q, who performed her own stunts. Like the other series characters in the film, Mai bears little resemblance to her in-game incarnation, in that she is instead American and an undercover CIA operative and a girlfriend of Iori Yagami. In the film, Mai fights together with Iori and Kyo to defeat the villain Rugal Bernstein in an alternative dimension. In 2018, Mai appeared in Hong Kong gambler comedy film Xiao Ao Du Jie.

Mai has made her first anime appearance in Fatal Fury 2: The New Battle (1993), where she follows Andy on his search for Krauser in Germany. She is approached and later attacked by Laurence Blood, but Andy defeats him and rescues her. In Fatal Fury: The Motion Picture (1994), Mai is present with Terry, Andy and Joe when a girl named Sulia gives them the quest to find the Armor of Mars and stop her brother Laocorn Gaudeamus. After the villain Hauer Blitzer fails to seduce Mai, he takes her prisoner after a fight, but she is again saved by Andy. Mai then defeats her rival Panni and participates in the final battle against her childhood best friend Laocorn, which ends with Laocorn dying to save her from the god of war, Mars.

Mai has only a minor role in the first episode of original net animation The King of Fighters: Another Day (2005), voiced by Akoya Sogi and Sheryl Stanley, wherein she and Athena Asamiya save Soiree Meira and a little girl from a collapsing building in USA. She is more prominent in YouTube computer-animated series The King of Fighters: Destiny (2017), voiced by Ami Koshimizu. In KOF: Destiny, after beating up some lecherous punks in London, Mai joins up with Yuri and King, as the leader of their new Queens Team to "let men know that women are the ones who rule the world". She quarrels with Andy when Benimaru tries to use this to seduce her, and joins the King of Fighters tournament hoping to face Andy in the finals. Before that can happen, however, Mai and her teammates come under control of Rugal Bernstein's evil power, making them attack the Fatal Fury Team. Andy is forced to fight and defeat her, after which she comes back to her senses to witness the final fight between Rugal and Kyo.

Other media, promotion and merchandise 
Mai appears in Dengeki G's Magazine drama CD series Fatal Fury, and in many manga, manhua and yonkoma comic books based on both the Fatal Fury and King of Fighters series, as well as adapting the SNK/Capcom crossover games. She is the main character in one of the Queen's Gate erotic gamebooks published in 2008 as part of the Queen's Blade series, in which she hopes she will be finally able to conquer Andy's heart if she proves herself the top female fighter of all time.

Mai's image was additionally licensed as a roulette character for pachislot machines. In 2003, SNK sued machine manufacturer Aruze for copyright infringement after Mai's and Terry Bogard's likenesses were used without permission for their pachinko game "Iregui". Mai is prominently featured in the Universal Fighting System collectible card game, and GungHo Games offered their users a Mai avatar skin. Reiko Chiba's single Non Stop! One Way Love includes the vocal track Kachou Fuugetsu Otome Mai (included in some SNK music compilations). In 2018, Chinese actor Xiong Ziqi released his single KO about Mai and Kyo.

The character of Mai Shiranui was used extensively by SNK for the purpose of promoting their games, other products, and the company as a whole. She was featured in live-action television commercials for Fatal Fury Special and Fatal Fury 2 in 1993. Multiple Mai "booth babe" models have been fixtures at Tokyo Game Show, noted for their popularity there, and at other events in Japan and elsewhere in East Asia. Asian celebrities, such as Korean idol Kyungri of Nine Muses and Chinese actress Li Bingbing, have appeared in costume as Mai to promote the games, and Mai's original voice actress Reiko Chiba too dressed up as Mai for an early official poster. Japanese actress and pinup model Sayuki Matsumoto was hired by SNK as an "image girl" to portray Mai for promotion of The King of Fighters XIII; Mai's other image models included Taiwanese actress Dou Hua Mei and Chinese model Ye Zi Xuan. Maggie Q's own promotional photo-shoot of Mai for the live-action movie showed her looking different than how she appeared in the film. Japanese adult actress Kirara Asuka portrayed Mai in a Taiwanese commercial for The King of Fighters World.

A 2005 fan-voted "Ultimate Mai Shiranui Cosplay Tournament" promotional event in Taiwan exhibited nearly a hundred women who dressed up as the character. One of SNK's attractions at the 2005 E3 was the signing of limited edition posters of Mai Shiranui by Falcoon. In 2009, Capcom teased UDON's SF20 art book by showing Akira Yasuda's image of Chun-Li and Mai Shiranui "almost kissing and almost punching each other". Mai featured heavily in promotional materials for The King of Fighters XIII, and an exclusive Mai Shiranui T-shirt given to all registered participants in the KOFXIII championship at the fighting game event EVO 2012. The King of Fighters XIV Premium Edition included a soundtrack with a Mai Shiranui illustrated case and the game's pre-order bonuses included a Mai PlayStation 4 theme. Mai was also announced to join the roster of the mobile action RPG SNK All-Star if the number of pre-registered users exceeds half million.

Scores of figures, statuettes and dolls have been made in her image. Such figures include those made by A-Label, Aizu Project, Alphamax, Daiki, Gantaku, Hobby Japan, Kinetiquettes, Max Factory, Volks, and SNK themselves. Some of them can be stripped topless, and an exclusive Volks figure was sold in an auction for the Make-A-Wish Foundation in 2009. Two action figures of Mai were made in the Cy Girls series, and her figurines were included in the Pinky:St and Nendroid series. Various other licensed Mai-themed merchandise include several official T-shirts, including one from a special edition of SNK Heroines: Tag Team Frenzy and small items related to the game, and a Neo Geo joystick controller for PlayStation consoles decorated with Mai-related imagery. An entirely Mai-themed Neo-Geo shop opened in Tokyo's Akihabara for a limited time in 2019–2020.

Reception

Cultural impact
Mai Shiranui (and other KOF characters) became especially popular among the young people in Hong Kong during the late 1990s, when their character design impacted on local youth culture, including the so-called 'MK look' that "has penetrated Hong Kong street fashion, action figures and martial arts comics". The character of Mai has become highly popular in the cosplay community around the world, including an early work of Francesca Dani. 1UP.com described Mai as "everyone's favorite cosplay choice", GamePro noted her as being "notable for being the favoured costume choice for cosplay attention-floozies", and eldiario.es called her and Chun-Li "true icons of cosplay". Her popularity among Chinese cosplayers increased after Mai's addition to Kings of Glory. Mai was a subject of cosplay by Yuuri Morishita, a Japanese booth companion turned a gravure idol, and many mainland Chinese and Taiwanese models, actresses and singers. The host of Chinese version of the TV show Cybernet between 2011 and 2012 was too dressed as Mai Shiranui. Kotaku's Brian Ashcraft noted in 2012: "In Asia—especially China and Taiwan—models keep popping [up] in non-gaming related events", arguing that rather than showing a following for the King of Fighters games, the character became popular because "the outfit is skimpy and revealing and has become a uniform of sorts". Singaporean pop-culture site Lollipop commented: "[The] Mai Shiranui outfit demands a special kind of physique, which is probably why it seems to be the go-to cosplay of models". In the West, British entertainer Cheryl Cole appeared in a Mai-inspired costume on her 2009 television special Cheryl Cole's Night In. Mai has additionally been depicted in dōjinshi fan comics (often erotic) and other fan productions, as well as in unofficial Japanese adult films.

Mai Shiranui's character notably pioneered the concept of breast physics in video games. Kotaku's Patricia Hernandez wrote "one of Fatal Fury 2'''s biggest contributions to the medium was that it was the first game to introduce a character with breasts that moved on their own ... though Fatal Fury may not be a huge franchise nowadays, its legacy is very much alive: many top fighting games include a similar jiggle effect". French magazine Hardcore Gamers commented that by 2002 "Mai has become a leading figure in fighting games to the point that many fighting games characters feature characters looking oddly like her", such as Jam Kuradoberi in Guilty Gear and Kasumi in Dead or Alive. The character Kali's look in the Korean game Dragon Nest was partially inspired by Mai, as was an alternative costume for Chun-Li Super Street Fighter IV. The red kunoichi costume of Kasumi in the arcade version of Dead or Alive 5 Ultimate was created as an official homage to Mai (who herself later appeared in the Last Round edition of the game). Giovanni Simotti, designer of Akane the Kunoichi, intended look of the titular character on the game's cover as "a small tribute to two of the most famous kunoichi from the history of the videogames – a mix of Mai Shiranui with a bit of Ibuki".

Reactions
Critical reception and popularity
Mai Shiranui's sex appeal escalated her popularity in Japan and worldwide, while the character herself is regarded as a female icon of SNK. Play Time claimed that "already a cult" of Mai had existed in Japan by 1994, two years after her debut. According to Kotaku's Ashcraft writing in 2010, "Mai is one of the most popular and recognisable fighting game characters. Her image has been recreated in countless figurines and endless fan art". Japanese arcade gaming magazine Gamest named her as one of the best characters for at least five consecutive years in its annual awards, placing her second in 1994, tenth in 1995, 21st in 1996, 28th in 1997, and 25th in 1998. It was similar in the Japanese Neo Geo magazine Neo Geo Freak, where she was for example third in 1998; Mai had been also voted the most popular female Neo Geo character by the female readers of Neo Geo Freak in 1997. Mai was the most-illustrated character in a 2009 fan art contest held by SNK Playmore and art website Pixiv to commemorate the fifteenth anniversary of the King of Fighters series. Mai was declared the 11th top video game heroine from the 1990s by Japanese magazine Famitsu in 2015, and landed fourth in their and SNK's joint poll for the most popular Neo Geo character in 2018. She was also voted the second most sexy fighting game character in history in a 2018 Japanese poll.

UGO Team commented in 2008, "the over-endowed, perpetually jiggling Mai has become not only a mascot for SNK's King of Fighters series, but also for the whole company. ... Mai is an unapologetic sex symbol ... While some decry Mai's ubiquitousness as pandering fan service, we're more than happy to pick up the yearly iterations of the King of Fighters franchise just to get fresh hands on this fetching fighter". Destructoid's editor-in-chief Dale North named "Terry and Andy Bogard, and the ever-bouncy Mai Shiranui" as the most popular of all characters from the Fatal Fury series, while China's Xinhua News Agency called Mai the most important female role in the history of SNK. In Brazil, Megagames retrospectively included her among the seven female characters who "dominated" the PlayStation 1 era in 2002 and Nintendo World rated her as the best female character in the GameCube fighting games in 2003, rating her a perfect 10/10. Kotaku's Luke Plunkett included her among the possible candidates for the title of the greatest video game character of all time in 2010, and Pembroke Daily Observer chose her among the 32 contenders for the title of "ultimate fighting game champion" in 2012. Similarly, in 2013, Spanish magazine Games Tribune described her as not only one of the most admired characters of SNK but also in the entire history of video games. Chilean publication CerUno ranked Mai as the sixth-most memorable heroine in their 2008 top-ten listing. In 2010, China's Mop.com included Mai on their list of ten strongest women in video games while Vietnamese website XãLuận.com included her among the five most famous heroines in gaming, and the Spanish edition of IGN ranked Mai as the eight top female video game character in 2012 and further described her as "one of the biggest legends of the '90s". Engadget's Colin Torretta opined "The King of Fighters games come heavily recommended ... if only for Mai Shiranui", and IGN Italy stated that they "all love" her. SNK's own The King of Fighters XIV premium artbook described her as "particularly popular with people overseas".

Mai Shiranui has drawn comparisons to the fighting-game genre's other early female icon, Street Fighters Chun-Li, with whom she shared the "Top Girls" entry in a 1994 ranking of fighting games by a Spanish magazine Hobby Consolas. UGO Networks declared Mai the "Chun-Li of the SNK universe", and Ed Laurence of Sinclair User wrote in 1993 that she was able to "out-Chun Li Chun Li". Previewing Capcom vs. SNK 2, GameSpot's Justin Speer wrote about its "beautiful and powerful females such as Chun-Li and Mai", and Rich Knight of Complex pitted the characters against each other in his 2011 "battle of the beauties" feature, stating: "Breasts or legs? Personally, we'll take 'em both". In ScrewAttack's "Death Battle!" series the same year, Mai, dubbed "the queen of fighters", defeated Chun-Li due to her greater nimbleness and superior ranged attack abilities. Mai Shiranui is also popular in Korea, where she received 62% of votes to Chun-Li's 19% in a 2009 South Korean online poll held on White Day, in which fans voted for their "most wanted" female fighting-game character. According to Crunchyroll's Nate Ming in 2016, Mai has continued to represent "SNK, Fatal Fury, and KoF in the same way that Chun-li [represents] Street Fighter". That same year, Aleksander Borszowski of Polish magazine CD-Action described Mai as the "second dame" of 2D fighting behind Chun-Li. Joystiq's Richard Mitchell stated: "There is one thing Street Fighter will never have, and that's Mai".

Mai has additionally drawn comparisons to other mainstream female game characters such as Lara Croft (Tomb Raider) and Ivy Valentine (Soulcalibur), as well as to some others such as Sailor Mars (Sailor Moon). A 1997 article in Game On! USA, highlighted Chun Li, Mai Shiranui, Michelle Chang (Tekken) and Jill Valentine (Resident Evil) as "video game characters who have marked the near absurd level of popularity of females in video games". Mexican publication Chilango grouped "Lara Croft/Chun Li/Mai Shiranui" together at the top of their list of "the women we have dreamed of in the nineties". Sara Sundman of ScrewAttack Magazine used Mai as an example of well-animated fan service breasts that move around realistically as she moves in games, unlike in some other cases such as that of DOA's Kasumi, and GamePro likened her with Taki from Soulcalibur as "a gravity-defying marvel of science and physicality". Kurt Katala of Hardcore Gaming 101 called the Street Fighters Maki Genryusai a "sexy Mai Shiranui ripoff", despite Maki having debuted only in Final Fight 2 in 1993. Comparisons between Mai and Maki have been made by other sources, including GameSpot, CNET, and IGN. Iroha from SNK's own Samurai Shodown VI was described as this game's "equivalent of Mai Shiranui" by Siliconera. Márcio Pacheco Alexsandro of Brazil's GameHall placed Mai at number one spot in his list of top female ninja characters in games, comparing her to Mortal Kombats Kitana in regards of their shared use of fans as a weapon, and noting her as an equal of Chun-Li within the fighting genre. Mai has also appeared on several other lists of top ninja characters in video games, including by CrunchGear in 2008, GamePro in 2010, and Arcade Sushi in 2013. UGO listed her among the "hot ninja girls" in all entertainment, Gelo Gonzales from the Filipino edition of FHM included Mai among the nine "sexiest ninja babes in games", and Complex placed her at number one in its list of "hot female killers" in video games.

In addition to her popularity with male fans, Mai has been a personal choice for some female gamers, such as Dawn Hughes of The Lakeland Mirror, who favorited Mai due to her costumes and being "fast, agile, and sexy", and Seraphina Brennan of Joystiq, who wrote in 2009 that "throughout all of the countless MMOs that we've played, we've always asked ourselves one important question: Where is Mai Shiranui and why can't I be her?" SNK Playmore's decision to feature Mai only in an unplayable cameo in 2009's The King of Fighters XII was met with media criticism and a fan backlashJC Fletcher, King of Fighters XIII brings Mai back this summer, Joystiq, March 25th 2010.Gelo Gonzales, Games Review: King of Fighters XIII, FHM.com.ph, November 24, 2011. sparking the meme phrase "no Mai, no buy". Shane Bettenhausen, director of business development for game publisher UTV Ignition Entertainment, likened the omission to Capcom leaving Chun-Li out of the original release of Street Fighter III, while Destructoid's Jim Sterling compared it to "releasing Street Fighter without Ryu". GameSpot's Andrew Park noted "the conspicuous absence of SNK's iconic female ninja/geisha girl" and Siliconera opined that "SNK isn't going to make that mistake again" in omitting Mai from future releases. Adam Biessener of Game Informer said of Mai's return: "Sometimes fan service is all a franchise needs to stay relevant—and SNK Playmore is certainly delivering that".

Sex appeal

Mai Shiranui was described as a "buxom fan-favorite" by Wired.com's Daniel Feit and the KOF "series' bosomy fan (service) favorite" by Michael McWhertor of Kotaku. Salehuddin Husin of GameAxis Unwired wrote in 2007: "Sex sells, and everyone knows it. Mai Shiranui from Fatal Fury first stumbled into this magical power when she captivated thousands of Ah Bengs the world over with the heaving bosoms during her matches". Mai was awarded the title of "Hottest Game Babe of 1994" by the staff of Electronic Gaming Monthly, and was chosen as the "Hottest Videogame Babe" of the year for the Video Game Awards '95 by readers of German magazine Mega Fun after receiving over half of all votes. Previously, Mega Fun also called Mai "a favourite of the editors that could leave the likes of Cammy from Super Street Fighter II or Blaze from Streets of Rage downright pale with envy". A 1996 review of Fatal Fury 3 in German magazine Video Games called her "the hottest babe in the universe" in English, and in 1998 they wrote she has still remained the prettiest "Fighting-Game-Babe" yet. American magazine Gamers' Republic gave Mai in Capcom vs. SNK the #3 "Game Babe o' the Year" award for 2000. In 2011, French website JeuxActu chose her as one of the game heroines they would like to repopulate the Earth, alongside Lara Croft and Bayonetta, and in 2012 Brazilian website Tribuna Hoje included her among the ten game heroines and villainesses they would like to come in flesh and blood. China's NetEase used her to as an example of a "sexy personality" in their 2011 article about the eight ingredients for an ultimately attractive female game character, and in 2014 Chilango described her as the very "sex symbol of video games".

Since her introduction, Mai has been featured in numerous lists of the sexiest female video game characters. Brazilian magazine Ação Games put her second on their list of "Top Girls" in 1997. In 2000, German magazine Video Games featured Mai in their "Console Pageant" article, rating her "VG Sexy Factor" at 95% as number one in Japanese games and tying her with Lara Croft. Bryan Johnson of GameSpy in 2003 ranked Mai the fourth-"top babe in games" in 2003: "With sexy babes being a part of fighting games, SNK set out to design a sexy fighting babe of their own. They probably went a little over the top". UGO Team placed Mai seventh on their list of top "girls of gaming" in 2008, as GameDaily's Robert Workman ranked her as the sixth "hottest game babe", while Johnny Firecloud of CraveOnline listed her fourth in his "hottest video game girl of all time" list in 2010. GameDaily also featured Mai in several "babe-of-the-week" galleries, including "Outrageous Boobs", "Asian Beauties", and the special "Mai Shiranui". In 2009, MSN declared Mai the fifth "hottest babe" in video games, and the staff of Complex included her in their list of the top ten "hottest video game girls". In 2011, UGO listed her among the 25 finest female characters from fighting games, and ranked her as the sixth top "videogame hottie". That same year, China's NetEase ranked her as number one top "eye candy" game character due to her beautiful face and body, skimpy outfits, sultry poses and jiggly movements, while China Radio International included her among seven most beautiful pair of legs in video games. Mai was ranked as the 19th and 18th "hottest" video game character Japan's GIGAZINE and by Larry Hester of Complex, respectively, and placed seventh in a similar list by Kristie Bertucci of Gadget Review. She was spotlighted in the 2012 listings of ten "sexiest girls of games" by Polish web portal Onet.pl, twenty "hottest women in video game history" by MSN Malaysia, and ten sexiest game characters by Brazil's TecMundo, who noted her as one of the most "sympathetic" characters in fighting games. In 2013, João Vitor de Oliveira of Brazilian edition of Official Xbox Magazine ranked Mai as the number one sexiest woman in fighting games and expressed satisfaction that she was created instead of a male character as it had been originally planned for her fighting style. Mai placed second in the 2013 ranking of "most sexually charged" female characters in gaming history by Stuart W. Bedford of WhatCulture, and was given the first place in the 2014 list of sexiest female video game characters as compiled by GameHall's Portal PlayGame.

Adam Wears of Cracked.com described Mai as "a fighter with so little clothing covering a pair of breasts so meticulously animated that we suspect they're constantly huddling together for warmth". According to Sherilynn Macale of The Feed in 2011, "if there's one female fighter who really is just the Queen of the Bosom, it's Mai Shiranui from King of Fighters. She is boobs". Including SNK Vs. Capcom among top five crossover games, 1UP.com's David Wolinsky wrote it "made for much more convenient ogling of Mai Shiranui's ample bosom regardless of a player's fighting-game allegiance". GameDaily discussed her in their 2007 article "Boobs Through the Years", stating that "when it comes to 2-D breasts, no character tops Mai Shiranui". In 2011, Ross Lincoln of GameFront ranked her bust as the fifth-best in gaming history, Rich Shivener of Joystick Division ranked her first in his list of "incredible chests" in video games, and NetEase's Game Channel placed her among top ten busty game heroines. In 2012, Mai's breasts placed first and second in similar lists by French edition of Tom's Games and by Drea Avellan of Complex, respectively,Drea Avellan, The 20 Best Pairs Of Boobies In Video Games, Complex, June 20, 2012. while Zachary Miller of Nintendo World Report ranked Mai as his third-favourite "chesty heroine" on Nintendo systems, calling her "arguably the queen of gaming cleavage". Ranking Mai as the 23rd-most dominant fighting game character in 2012, Complex noted she is "mostly known for having the most ridiculous pair of baby feeders in gaming history. She still moves faster than the wind and puts up a good fight with those things". The magazine's Rich Knight commented: "Mai Shiranui is the queen mother of outlandish bouncing breasts. She was the first animated babe to really have them featured in a game and is still considered by many to be the female game character all bouncing breasts are judged off of". French Retropolis placed Mai and her "heavy artillery" third in a 2013 ranking of the sexiest fighting-game girls that was judged on their busts. ChinaByte stated in 2015: "If you want to count down the TOP10 busty action heroines, Mai Shiranui is certainly among the best".

Korean website GameMeca pointed out to Mai's "breathtaking" kunoichi costume as the main reason for her lasting popularity. Chinese edition of FHM placed her on the cover in 2008. In 2010, Mai topped machinima.com's list of "gaming's top cleavagey characters" and PLAY placed her third in its list of top "side-boobs" in games. Craig Skistimas of ScrewAttack's Top 10 rated Mai's "Everyone-Pleaser" costume from the original Fatal Fury the second-"sexiest outfit" in 2011, and it placed third in a similar list by ZoominGames in 2012. Role-playing video game designer Brian Mitsoda imagined "Continue?, a little joint on the Sunset Strip where the game development crowd goes to get away from the public" with "ninja bartenders passing along a mix of vodka and spree to the waitress in the Mai Shiranui outfit". MSN commented in 2009: "There is no denying the fact that most gamers know of Mai Shiranui ... The developers may have created a character that will upset every feminist out there, but the guys ain't complaining".

However, some have commented negatively about the perceived sexualization of the character. Heavy.com described Mai as "notable for having one of the sluttiest costumes in video game history". In citing Mai and Dead or Alive characters Kasumi and Ayane as "the 'fan favourite' lady ninjas", Kotaku's Matthew S. Burns said: "Why are the costume designs for female ninja often so...fanservicey? A lot of [game] creators seem to feel that female ninja are ok to treat as sex objects". Chris Heyward of SNES N-Force commented in his 1994 review of Fatal Fury 2: "Unfortunately ... Mai Shiranui's boobs are the only interest in this game. And it's not just me; everyone who had a go retorted, 'What a crap game...nice pair though'". Lyle Masaki of NewNowNext said in 2008: "Fighting games have a long history of sexualizing female characters (remember Mai Shiranui's 'Me Bouncy!' victory cry?), but the same doesn't happen as often with the male characters". Chris Jager of PC World remarked in 2010: "How she manages to stay upright with those things grafted to her chest—let alone engage in martial arts—is a mystery for the ages". Comic book artist Adam Warren drew a picture of his own character Emp cosplaying as Mai Shiranui; the drawing shows the character saying: "This goofy costume would be even more potentially mortifying that my own stupid supersuit!" and declaring her "sincerest sympathies" for Mai.

Masahiro Sakurai, director of Nintendo's Super Smash Bros. series, said that Mai Shiranui was not included in Super Smash Bros. Ultimate along with the other SNK characters, implying in his speech that the character's design was too suggestive to enter the game due to the rating board of Japan called CERO and how he wanted to maintain the rating on a lower scale instead of having to change the entire character.

Other versions
Debating the merits of polygonal fighting games in 1998, Hyper used a question whether "Would Mai Shiranui be as bouncy in polygonal form?" as an argument "that some aspects of the 2D fighting medium cannot be replicated into 3D". Nevertheless, in a review of the 3D The King of Fighters: Maximum Impact six year later, the staff of Official Xbox Magazine opined that "Mai Shiranui's heaving bosom redesigned to fully utilise the immense funbag recreating power of the Xbox" was "exactly what the doctor ordered". David Clayman and Jeremy Dunham from IGN applaued "a wonderful job" done redesigning the Maximum Impact characters "to the modern age", including "Mai's new shorthair look", and opining they "all look great -- and in some instances, surpass the classic designs that were established so many years ago"; meanwhile Hardcore Gamer positively noted how "Mai Shiranui's bouncy, laid-back personality [still] shows in her stance". In 2016, GameZone's James Wynne wrote that with the inclusion of Mai, the 3D fighter "Dead or Alive 5: Last Round wins our brand new award for most appropriate fighting game cross-over in history, demolishing Akuma's appearance in Tekken 7" and the game features so far "the best looking iteration of the Mai Shiranui character". Adam Beck from Hardcore Gamer opined that as "Mai is a ninja in her own series, she seems to fit perfectly within the Dead or Alive ethos".

The character has received mostly negative reception in regards to her film appearances. GamesRadar's Henry Gilbert commented in 2014 that Fatal Fury: The Motion Picture director Masami Ōbari "never miss[ed] a chance to fill the screen with her heaving chest" while devoting more attention to her shower segment than to the film's fight scenes. In The Complete Anime Guide, Trish Ledoux noted that "the animation of modern-day ninja girl Mai Shiranui gave an all-new meaning to *bouncy* anime girls". John Funk of The Escapist wrote that Mai's costume in the live-action The King of Fighters was "not nearly as cleavage-tacular as it needs to be" and recommended "getting some members from Tecmo's Team Ninja as consultants". Jeff Gerstmann of Giant Bomb remarked in 2009: "Maggie Q ... as Mai Shiranui? Let me be the last to say 'that seems like an awful choice'. That seems like an awful choice". Tein Hee Seow of Stuff.com described the "oddball" casting as "quite a departure from how the amply endowed character is portrayed in the game". However, Peter Rubin of Complex'' placed Mai second in his 2011 ranking of the "hottest women in video game movies": "We're sold. Beautiful, badass, and more proof that 'SNK Games' stands for 'Sexy with No Klothes'".

See also

List of Fatal Fury characters
List of The King of Fighters characters
Ninja in popular culture
Nakoruru

Notes

References

External links

Mai at The King of Fighters 15th Anniversary official website
Mai at the Fatal Fury 15th Anniversary official website 

Action film characters
Fatal Fury characters
Female characters in anime and manga
Female characters in video games
Fictional Central Intelligence Agency personnel
Fictional female martial artists
Fictional female ninja
Fictional Japanese people in video games
Fictional judoka
Fictional martial artists in video games
Fictional Ninjutsu practitioners
Fictional tessenjutsuka
Ninja characters in video games
SNK protagonists
The King of Fighters characters
Woman soldier and warrior characters in video games
Video game characters introduced in 1992
Video game characters with fire or heat abilities
Video game mascots
Vigilante characters in video games
Sexuality in fiction